Pachliopta adamas is a swallowtail butterfly belonging to the genus Pachliopta, the roses, or red-bodied swallowtails. It is found in Bawan, Java, and Enggano.

Subspecies
Pachliopta adamas adamas
Pachliopta adamas agricola Tsukada & Nishiyama, 1980 (Tanahjampea)

Taxonomy
Sometimes treated as a subspecies of Pachliopta aristolochiae.

References

Butterflies described in 1831
Pachliopta